Reggie is a given name, usually a short form of the name Reginald. It may refer to:

People 
 Reggie Bonnafon (born 1996), American football player
 Reggie Brown (disambiguation), multiple people
 Reggie Bush (born 1985), National Football League running back for the New Orleans Saints
 Reggie Cleveland (born 1948), former Major League Baseball pitcher
 Reggie Corrigan (born 1970), former Irish rugby union player
 Reggie Fils-Aimé (born 1961), former President and COO for the North American division of Nintendo
 Reggie Gilliam (born 1997), American football player
 Reggie Jackson (born 1946), American retired baseball player
 Reggie Johnson (disambiguation), multiple people
 Reggie Jones (disambiguation), multiple people
 Reggie Kray (1933–2000), of the criminal Kray twins
 Reggie Leach (born 1950), Canadian retired hockey player
 Reggie Lucas (1953–2018), American musician and record producer
 Reggie Mathis (born 1956), American football player
 Reggie Miller (born 1965), former basketball player for the Indiana Pacers
 Reggie Perry (basketball) (born 2000), American basketball player
 Reggie Redding (born 1988), American basketballer
 Reggie Redding (American football) (born 1968), American football player
 Reggie Robinson (born 1997), American football player
 Reggie Roby (1961–2005), American football punter
 Reggie Sanders (born 1967), former baseball player
 Reggie Schwarz (1875–1918), South African cricketer
 Reggie Smith (disambiguation), multiple people
 Reggie Theus (born 1957), former National Basketball Association player and head coach, currently assistant coach of the Minnesota Timberwolves
 Reggie Upshaw (born 1995), American basketball player in the Israel Basketball Premier League
 Reggie Walker (disambiguation), multiple people
 Reggie Watts (born 1972), American comedian and musician
 Reggie Wayne (born 1978), wide receiver for the Indianapolis Colts
 Reggie White (disambiguation), multiple people
 Reggie Williams (disambiguation), multiple people
 Reggie Yates (born 1983), English DJ
 Reggie Young (born 1936), lead guitarist of the American Sound Studios Band
 Reggie (wrestler) (born 1993), American professional wrestler
 Nickname of Harry George Smart (1891–1963), British vice air marshal

Fictional characters
 Reggie, the turkey protagonist in the animated film Free Birds
Reggie (Phantasm), protagonist in the Phantasm horror film series 
Regina "Reggie" Belmont, protagonist of the 1984 film Night of the Comet 
Regina "Reggie" Lampert, in the 1963 film Charade, played by Audrey Hepburn 
 Reggie Mantle, in the Archie comics
 Reggie Montgomery, from the soap opera All My Children
 Reggie Pepper, in seven short stories by P. G. Wodehouse
 Reggie Perrin, the main character in The Fall and Rise of Reginald Perrin novel and 1970s television series, as well as the 2000s Reggie Perrin television series
Reggie Peters, on Netflix’s Julie and the Phantoms
 Reggie Potter, title character of the 1983 American TV series Reggie, based on the series The Fall and Rise of Reggie Perrin
Regina "Reggie" Rocket, from the animated TV series Rocket Power
 Reggie Rowe, in the video game Infamous Second Son
 Regulus "Reggie" Black, The brother of Sirius black AKA R.A.B

Animals
 Reggie (alligator)

Hypocorisms
Unisex given names
Nicknames
English-language given names
English masculine given names